The New Alliance of Faso (NAFA) is a social democratic political party in Burkina Faso.

History
NAFA was established on 31 January 2015, with many of its members having previously been part of the Congress for Democracy and Progress or the ADF–RDA. In the 2015 general elections it received 4% of the vote, winning two of the 127 seats in the National Assembly, one by proportional representation (taken by Zilma Bacye) and one in the constituency vote (Anicet Bazie in Sanguié Province).

References

2015 establishments in Burkina Faso
Political parties established in 2015
Political parties in Burkina Faso
Social democratic parties in Burkina Faso